Anchorless is Kacy Crowley's major label debut released on Atlantic in 1997.
This album had been released as a limited edition indie release in 1996 and was re-released by Atlantic in 1998, subsequently with a different track listing.

Track listing 

 "Hand To Mouthville"
 "Rebellious"
 "Bottlecap"
 "Singers Are Ugly"
 "Melancholy Bridge"
 "Vertigo"
 "Anything"
 "Nickel To The Stone"
 "Follow Me Outside"
 "Scars"
 "Love Is Close"
 "Eclipse"

All tracks written by Kacy Crowley except:
 Melancholy Bridge (Kacy Crowley and Billy Harvey)

References

1997 albums
Kacy Crowley albums